Inat, INAT, or iNat may refer to:

 iNaturalist, a biology-oriented citizen science project
 INAT, an Indian admissions test for doctoral students in astronomy and astrophysics (see List of admission tests to colleges and universities#India
 Institut National Agronomique de Tunisie (INAT), an agricultural university in Tunisia
 Kemal Inat (born 1971), Turkish political science professor